The Club de Radioexperimentadores de Nicaragua (CREN) (n English, Nicaraguan Radio Experimenters Club) is a national non-profit organization for amateur radio enthusiasts in Nicaragua.   Key membership benefits of the CREN include a QSL bureau for those amateur radio operators in regular communications with other amateur radio operators in foreign countries, and a network to support amateur radio emergency communications.  CREN represents the interests of Nicaraguan amateur radio operators before Nicaraguan and international regulatory authorities.  CREN is the national member society representing Nicaragua in the International Amateur Radio Union.

See also 
International Amateur Radio Union

References

External links
 

Nicaragua
Clubs and societies in Nicaragua
1945 establishments in Nicaragua
Organizations established in 1945
Radio in Nicaragua
Organizations based in Managua